Pain Kuh (also Romanized as Pā’īn Kūh; also known as Palkin and Pegin) is a village in Bonab Rural District, in the Central District of Zanjan County, Zanjan Province, Iran. At the 2006 census, its population was 597, in 141 families.

References 

Populated places in Zanjan County